St James is a Tyne and Wear Metro station, serving St James' Park, Newcastle upon Tyne in Tyne and Wear, England. It joined the network as a terminus station on 14 November 1982, following the opening of the fourth phase of the network, between Tynemouth and St James via Wallsend.

History
The station is situated below St James' Park – the home of Newcastle United Football Club. The interior of the station is decorated in black and white stripes (the colours of Newcastle United F.C.), featuring images depicting players and managers from the past and present. When the station was first opened, it was finished in the same colour scheme as other stations on the network – cream and cadmium yellow.

Facilities 
Step-free access is available at all stations across the Tyne and Wear Metro network, with two lifts providing step-free access to platforms at St. James. As part of the Metro: All Change programme, new lifts were installed at St. James in 2013, with new escalators installed in 2016. The station is equipped with ticket machines, seating, next train information displays, timetable posters, and an emergency help point on both platforms. Ticket machines are able to accept payment with credit and debit card (including contactless payment), notes and coins. The station is fitted with automatic ticket barriers, which were installed at 13 stations across the network during the early 2010s, as well as smartcard validators, which feature at all stations.

A pay and display car park (operated by Newcastle City Council) is available, with 345 spaces, as well as a taxi rank. There is also the provision for cycle parking, with five cycle pods available for use.

Services 
, the station is served by up to five trains per hour on weekdays and Saturday, and up to four trains per hour during the evening and on Sunday.

Rolling stock used: Class 599 Metrocar

References

External links
 
 Timetable and station information for St James

Newcastle upon Tyne
1982 establishments in England
Railway stations in Great Britain opened in 1982
Tyne and Wear Metro Yellow line stations
Transport in Newcastle upon Tyne
Transport in Tyne and Wear
Railway stations located underground in the United Kingdom
